Cancellaria obesa, common name : the obese nutmeg, is a species of sea snail, a marine gastropod mollusk in the family Cancellariidae, the nutmeg snails.

Description
The size of an adult shell varies between 24 mm and 57 mm.

Distribution
This species is distributed in the Pacific Ocean along Baja California, Mexico, Ecuador and Galapagos.

References

 Hemmen J. (2007). Recent Cancellariidae. Wiesbaden, 428pp

External links
 

Cancellariidae
Gastropods described in 1832